The Higüey Prison fire occurred on March 7, 2005, at Higüey Prison in Higüey, Dominican Republic.

The prison was claimed to be overcrowded at the time of the fire, housing 400 inmates but designed to house only 180. In all, 136 prisoners died. Among those killed was Edwin Adams Cotto.

The fire's cause was variously attributed to an inmate riot, guards firing tear gas, or a prisoner setting fire to a mattress.

References

2005 in the Dominican Republic
2005 crimes in the Dominican Republic
2005 murders in North America
2000s murders in the Dominican Republic
Arson in North America
Mass murder in 2005
Prison fires
Fires in the Dominican Republic
La Altagracia Province